Pramatha Nath Roy (1944-2019), popularly known as P.N. Roy, was an Indian politician and was the Minister of State for Development & Planning in the Government of West Bengal. He was an MLA, elected from the Kaliaganj Assembly constituency in 1996, 2001, 2011 and 2016.

He resigned from the ministry when Congress withdrew its support to the Mamata Banerjee government in September 2012.

Pramatha Nath Roy, son of Rabindra Nath Ray, was born on 7 October 1944. He was a postgraduate in humanities.

P.N. Roy died on 31 May 2019 at the end of 75 in Kolkata, causing his constituency to go vacant and have a bypoll, which was won by Tapan Deb Singha of All India Trinamool Congress.

References 

State cabinet ministers of West Bengal
West Bengal MLAs 1996–2001
West Bengal MLAs 2001–2006
West Bengal MLAs 2011–2016
West Bengal MLAs 2016–2021
Indian National Congress politicians
1944 births
Living people